The Shape of English: Structure and History is a 1987 book by Roger Lass in which the author examines the history and structure of the English language.

Reception
The book was reviewed by John Algeo, Richard M. Hogg and Alan Ward.

References

External links
 The Shape of English: Structure and History

1987 non-fiction books
Historical linguistics books
English grammar books